Jonathan Carroll (born 1949) is an American fiction writer.

Jonathan Carroll may also refer to:
Jonathan Carroll (politician), American politician

See also
Jonathan Carril (born 1984), Spanish footballer
John Carroll (disambiguation)
Johnny Carroll (disambiguation)